Robert Abdy may refer to:

 Sir Robert Abdy, 3rd Baronet (1688–1748), British politician
 Robert Abdy (cricketer) (1860–1899), English cricketer and Royal Navy officer
Robert Abdy (master) on List of Masters of Balliol College
 Sir Robert Abdy, 1st Baronet (c. 1615–1670) of the Abdy baronets of Albyns (1660)
 Sir Robert Henry Edward Abdy, 5th Baronet (1896–1976) of the Abdy baronets of Albyns (1849)
 Robert Abdy (born 1978), heir apparent to the Abdy baronets of Albyns (1849)